Celles is a municipality of Wallonia located in the province of Hainaut, Belgium. 

The municipality consists of the following districts: Celles, Escanaffles, Molenbaix, Popuelles, Pottes, and Velaines.

See also
List of municipalities of Belgium

References

External links
 

Municipalities of Hainaut (province)